The  Justices of the Supreme Court of Nigeria are members of The Supreme Court Of Nigeria  composed by the Chief Justice of Nigeria other Justices of the Supreme Court  not more than 21 including the chief justice, appointed by the President on the recommendation of the National Judicial Council, (NJC) and subject to confirmation by the Nigerian Senate. Justices of the Supreme Court must be qualified to practice law in Nigeria, and must have been so qualified for a period not less than fifteen years. Justices of the Supreme Court of Nigeria have a mandatory retirement age of 70 years. In June 2019, when the court had 16 justices, the president wrote the CJN, asking him as the chairman of the National Judicial Council (NJC) to “initiate in earnest the process of appointing additional five Justices of the Supreme Court of Nigeria to make the full complement of Justices of the Supreme Court” as contained in the Nigerian Constitution. After the quarter of 2020, a number of justices retired, making the number of justices to 13 justices and increasing the work load on the bench. The recommendation from the National Judicial Council for the appointment of 8 new judges in 2020 after the confirmation by the Nigerian Senate increased the number to 21 Justices. After the death of Justice Nwali Sylvester Ngwuta, the retirement of Justice Bode Rhodes-Vivour, the death of Justice Samuel Oseji, the retirement of Justice Mary Odili, the retirement of Justice Ejembi Eko, the retirement of Justice Abdu Aboki and the resignation of Chief Justice Ibrahim Tanko Muhammad, it became a total number of 13 Justices in the Supreme Court of Nigeria including the Chief Justice of Nigeria.

Current Justices Of the Supreme Court

Olukayode Ariwoola
Musa Datijo Muhammad
Kudirat Kekere-Ekun
Chima Centus Nweze
Amina Augie
Uwani Musa Abba Aji
John Inyang Okoro
Lawal Garba
Helen M. Ogunwumiju
I.N. M. Saulawa
Adamu Jauro
Tijjani Abubakar
Emmanuel A. Agim

References

Supreme Court of Nigeria justices